Palmas (Palm trees; Akwẽ-Xerénte: Akwẽ krikahâzawre wam hã ) is the capital and largest city of the state of Tocantins, Brazil. According to IBGE estimates from 2020, the city had 306,296 inhabitants.

Palmas is located at the state's geographic centre at an average altitude of 230 m (755 ft). The city is located between the Serra do Lajeado hills on the east and the Tocantins River on the west. Palmas has a metropolitan area with 471,639 inhabitants.

Palmas was founded in 1990 and developed from the ground up in a former agricultural area as the capital of the new state of Tocantins, formed under the 1988 constitution. It was intended to develop a relatively undeveloped area of the nation to provide better jobs for people. The city has a well-designed road system, and its urban zoning is modeled on that of Brasília, the national capital. A symmetrical park lies at the city centre, and a large central avenue similar to Brasília's extends north to south. The city is home to the Federal University of Tocantins.

The Palmas Airport connects Palmas with many Brazilian cities.

History
The area where Palmas was built was originally used for agriculture. Before 1990, the only village in the location was Vila Canela (near the river Tocantins, and near the Graciosa beach). The village and the beach were often flooded as the new reservoir lake was developed. The flat area of Palmas is between the river and the Serra do Lajeado hills in the east, and the vegetation is the typical cerrado. In 1989 Miracema was the temporary capital of the state.

The new capital was initially designed by the architects Luiz Fernando Cruvinel Teixeira and Walfredo de Oliveira Filho. From 20 May 1989, some of the roads and baracas were built. The government had decided to develop the capital on the east side of the river, in order to stimulate development on the east side of the state. This is also the geodesic center of Brazil.

Before the dam was constructed and the reservoir developed, the Tocantins River made curves, forming what would look like the letter S when looking at it from a bird's eye view. It is said that developer Siquera Campos enjoyed the S-like formation, and that added to the choice of the location for Palmas. When the area was chosen in January 1989, Campos decided he wanted the Palacio (the state headquarter) to be built on the highest place in Palmas. Although the architects said the hill was too soft to build on, it was still built. The temporary Palacinho (said to be the first building in Palmas) is standing, but it has been replaced by another Palacio, constructed nearby. The Palacinho is kept as a monument of the early development, and since 2002, it has been used as a museum for Tocantins' history.

Geography
Tocantins is a state between the Amazon Rainforest and the coastal savanna. As a result, its geography is varied. Many rivers cross through the state (including the Tocantins River). Researchers have identified more than 20 archaeologically significant sites of early indigenous cultures in the state.

The municipality contains 88% of the  Lajeado State Park.

Climate
Most of Tocantins, including where Palmas is located, (except the extreme west and northern regions) is situated within a vast Brazilian area known as the cerrado. The cerrado region's typical climate is hot, semi-humid, with pronounced seasonality marked by a dry winter season from May through September. The annual rainfall is around 800 to 1600 mm. The soils are generally very old, deep, and naturally nutrient-poor.

Palmas is one of the hottest capital cities in Brazil. During the May to September dry season, Palmas can be oppressively hot as temperatures climb into the high 30s (°C). During the October to April rainy season, it is not as hot.  The heavy rains and cloud cover keep it much cooler. Palmas receives generous rainfall of about 1,300 mm. It is situated in a 'bow' valley of Rio Tocantins and surrounded by mountains from three sides; with its low elevation, 195 metres above sea level, these factors increase the humidity and discomfort of hot days.

Vegetation

In spite of being technically located in a watershed of the Amazon basin, Palmas has no rainforest. Typical are short shrubland trees common to a cerrado region. While the city layout was being developed, builders preserved many of the original trees, left intact in green areas along the widely spaced avenues. Many street trees in Palmas are much older than the city, which was started in 1990. Man-planted palms also grace the main thoroughfare, Avenida JK.

Economy

Palmas was designed to be the economic and administrative center of Tocantins. The service sector is the main driver of the economy. The share of agriculture in the economy is less than the service sector, being based on small farms around the city and the highways that provide access to Palmas. Larger farms, which cultivate soybeans and raise livestock, are located in the district of Buritirana.

The economy is mostly formal, consisting primarily of limited partnerships and sole proprietorships. Micro firms are the most common in the city, where they comprise over 80% of the 4394 companies.
The city has four industrial districts, among them the Industrial District of Palmas, Tocantins Industrial District I Industrial District, and Industrial District Tocantins II of Taquaralto. All are located along the highways and TO-050 TO-010.

Today Palmas city has become a center whose trade and economic influence covers the entire state of Tocantins, in addition to the southeastern Pará, the northeastern Mato Grosso, and the southern Maranhão.
In town are branches of the following national banks: Banco do Brasil (7 agencies), Bradesco (five agencies, one of Bradesco Prime), Caixa Econômica Federal (4 agencies, 3 more ATM's), Itaú Unibanco (3 agencies), Banco da Amazônia (2 agencies), HSBC (1 agency), Santander (1 agency), Banco BMG (1 agency), Banco Cruzeiro do Sul (1 agency), and Tribanco (1 agency). Palmas has seven self-service terminals of the Banco 24 Horas interbank network.

In 2007 the Gross Domestic Product had a strong expansion was estimated at $2.2 billion, driven by investments of the City of Palms in the economy. The increase in GDP of Palmas was 6% and, compared to that of Brazil was very considerable, as the country showed the percentage of 3.5%. By the end of 2007, and capital represented 18.4% of the wealth generated by Tocantins and 0.08% in the country. Due to this growth, Palmas has attracted major investments, such as the Capim Dourado Shopping (inaugurated in August/2010), the multimodal yard of the North-South (located in the municipality of Porto Nacional, on the banks of the TO-080), plus branches of hypermarket networks: Atacadão, Makro, Extra and Assam.

Governance

As in all cities in Brazil, Palmas has separate Executive and Legislative branches of local government, represented by the Mayor of Palmas and the Local Assembly, respectively. Since its founding, Palmas has had 5 elected Mayors. The current incumbent is Cinthia Ribeiro, who succeeded Carlos Amastha (PP).

Mayors
 Fenelon Barbosa, 1990-1992 
 , 1993-1996 
 Odir Rocha, 1997-2000 
 , 2001-2004 
 , 2005-2012 
 , 2013-2018 
 , 2018-

Demographics

Sister cities
  Araguaína, Tocantins, Brazil
  Colorado Springs, Colorado, United States

Education

Educational institutions include:
 Universidade Federal do Tocantins (UFT)
 Centro Universitário Luterano de Palmas (Ceulp-Ulbra)
 Faculdade Católica do Tocantins (Católica do Tocantins)
 Fundação Universidade do Tocantins (Unitins)
 Faculdade Objetivo

Tourism
Palmas is close to Taquaruçu, an ecotourism resort and village located in the hills. Its cooler  microclimate and natural surroundings attract many tourists from Palmas, other regions of Brazil and abroad. Taquaruçu is famous for the many waterfalls (cachoeiras) surrounding it, where tourists can swim and also practice sports like rappel.

Transport 
Palmas is served by a local public bus service  and an interstate bus service. Rodoviaria (central bus station) is located at the edge of city, with connections to all capitals of Brazil.

Airport

The city is served by the Palmas Airport. Planned for a population of one million, Palmas airport is uncrowded, with only a few flights per day, mostly to and from Brasília. The airport is 30 km from city center, and is served by city bus (2 buses).

Highways
The Rodovia Coluna Prestes (TO-050) connects the city with Brasília. The Federal Highway (BR-153) connects Palmas north and south through a 60 km drive west to Paraiso de Tocantins. BR-153 is mostly not twinned. The principal avenue of the city is the avenida Theotônio Segurado, connecting the North Director Plan with Taquaralto, on the South Palmas.

Railway
There is no passenger rail service to Palmas. The newly constructed North-South Railway (Ferrovia Norte-Sul), runs near Palmas. It is intended to alleviate Brazil's heavy truck traffic and to carry bulk goods to ports in North-Eastern Brazil.

Sports
In sports, the most notable football club in the city is Palmas FR, which plays at the Nilton Santos Stadium. Palmas has several sports and entertainment clubs, with swimming pools, other sports and cultural programs, clubs such as AABB and SESC.

In August 2014 Palmas was chosen as the first host city of the World Indigenous Games, a multisport competition held in September 2015.

See also
 World Indigenous Games

References

External links

 City Hall of Palmas website
 Government of the State of Tocantins website

 
State capitals in Brazil
Planned cities in Brazil
Planned capitals
Municipalities in Tocantins
1989 establishments in Brazil
Populated places established in 1989